The Catholic Church in Tunisia is part of the worldwide Catholic Church, under the spiritual leadership of the Pope in Rome.

Dioceses

The Catholic church in Tunisia presently comprises only a single Latin archbishopric, in the national capital Tunis : 
 the non-Metropolitan Roman Catholic Archdiocese of Tunis.

There are no Eastern Catholic, pre-diocesan or other exempt jurisdictions in Tunisia.

As this solo-episcopate warrants no national conference, it partakes in the regional Episcopal conference of Northern Africa (French: Conférence Episcopale Régionale du Nord de l’Afrique,  C.E.R.N.A.) together with Algeria, Morocco (hosting the headquarters in Rabat), Western Sahara and Libya, the 'Great Maghreb' (Arab region West of Egypt).

There is also an Apostolic Nunciature (papal diplomatic representation at embassy-level) to Tunisia, which is however vested in the Apostolic Nunciature to neighbour Algeria (in Algiers).

All defunct jurisdictions are precursors of current (residential or, mostly, titular) sees.

Archdiocese
There are around 30,700 Catholics in this predominantly Islamic country, which forms a single diocese – the Archdiocese of Tunis. Accordingly, the only Catholic cathedral is that of St. Vincent de Paul in Tunis. The building was completed in 1897, while Tunisia was a French protectorate. Catholic influence during the colonial period also included extensive missionary work by the French Primate of Africa, Cardinal Lavigerie. The cathedral in his time was the church of Saint Louis in Carthage, was also built in the 19th century, when the archdiocese, under Cardinal Lavigerie, held the primacy of all Roman Africa.

Titular sees 

 One Metropolitan Titular archbishopric : Carthage [Ancient & modern]
 343 Episcopal Titular bishoprics : Abaradira, Abari, Abbir Germaniciana, Abbir Maius, Abidda, Abitinæ, Abora, Absa Salla, Abthugni, Abziri, Acholla, Æliæ, Africa (see), Afufenia, Agbia, Aggar, Aggersel, Altiburus, Ammædara, Amudarsa, Ancusa, Apisa maius, Aptuca, Aquæ Albæ in Byzacena, Aquæ in Byzacena, Aquæ in Proconsulari, Aquæ novæ in Proconsulari, Aquæ regiæ, Assuras, Aurusuliana, Ausafa, Ausana, Ausuaga, Autenti, Auzegera, Avensa, Avioccala, Avissa, Avitta Bibba, Bahanna, Bararus, Basilinoplis, Bassiana, Bavagaliana, Belali, Bencenna, Beneventum, Bennefa, Bilta, Bisica, Bladia, Bonusta, Boseta, Bossa, Botriana, Buleliana, Bulla, Bulla regia, Bulna, Bure, Buruni, Buslacena, Cabarsussi, Cæciri, Canapium, Capsa, Carcabia, Cariana, Carpi, Cebarades, Cefala, Cellæ in Proconsulari, Cenæ, Cenculiana, Cerbali, Cercina, Chusira, Cibaliana, Cilibia, Cillium, Cincari, Cissita, Clypia, Crepedula, Cresima, Cubda, Cufruta, Culusi, Curubis, Decoriana, Dices, Dionysiana, Druas, Drusiliana, Dura, Edistiana, Egnatia, Byzacena, Eguga, Elephantaria in Proconsulari, Febiana, Feradi maius, Feradi minus, Filaca, Fissiana, Foratiana, Forontoniana, Furnos maior, Furnos minor, Gaguari, Garriana, Gemellæ in Byzacena, Germaniciana, Girba, Gisipa, Giufi, Giufi Salaria, Gor, Gratiana, Gubaliana, Gummi in Byzacena, Gummi in Proconsulari, Gunela, Gurza, Hadrumetum * (?formerly Metropolitan Archbishopric), Hermiana, Hierpiniana, Hilta, Hippo Diarrhytus, Hirina, Horrea Cœlia, Horta, Iubaltiana, Iunca in Byzacena, Lacubaza, Lapda, Lares, Leptiminus, Libertina, Limisa, Luperciana, Macon, Macriana maior, Macriana minor, Mactaris, Madarsuma, Maraguia, Marazanæ, Marazanæ regiæ, Marcelliana, Masclianæ, Matara in Proconsulari, Materiana, Mattiana, Maximiana in Byzacena, Maxula Prates, Medeli, Mediana, Megalopolis in Proconsulari, Melzi, Membressa, Menefessi, Mibiarca, Midica, Mididi, Migirpa, Mimiana, Missua, Mizigi, Mozotcori, Mulli, Munatiana, Musti, Mutia, Muzuca in Byzacena, Muzuca in Proconsulari, Nara, Naraggara, Nationa, Neapolis in Proconsulari, Nepte, Nova, Numluli, Obba, Octaba, Octabia, Paria in Proconsolare, Pederodiana, Pertusa, Pia, Pisita, Præcausa, Præsidium, Pupiana, Puppi, Putia in Byzacena, Quæstoriana, Rucuma, Rufiniana, Ruspæ, Rusuca, Saia maior, Sassura, Scebatiana, Scilium, Sebarga, Segermes, Selemselæ, Selendeta, Semina, Semta, Septimunicia, Serra, Severiana, Sicca Veneria, Siccenna, Sicilibba, Simidicca, Simingi, Siminina, Simitthu, Sinna, Sinnuara, Suas (Chaouache?), Succuba, Sufes, Sufetula, Suliana, Sullectum, Sululos, Sutunurca, Tabalta, Tabbora, Tacia montana, Taddua, Tagarata, Tagarbala, Tagaria, Tagase, Talaptula, Tamalluma, Tamata, Tamazeni, Tambeæ, Tanudaia, Taparura, Taraqua, Tarasa in Byzacena, Teglata in Proconsulari, Tela, Temuniana, Tepelta, Tetci, Thabraca, Thagamuta, Thala, Thapsus, Thasbalta, Thelepte, Thenæ, Theudalis, Theuzi, Thibaris, Thibica, Thibiuca, Thiges, Thignica, Thimida, Thimida regia, Thisiduo, Thizica, Thuburbo maius, Thuburbo minus, Thuburnica, Thubursicum-Bure, Thucca terebenthina, Thuccabora, Thugga, Thunigaba, Thunudruma, Thunusuda, Thysdrus, Tigias, Tigimma, Tiguala, Tinisa in Proconsulari, Tisili, Tituli in Proconsulari, Trisipa, Trofimiana, Tubernuca, Tubulbaca, Tubyza, Tulana, Tunes (now Tunis), Tunnuna, Turres in Byzacena, Turris in Proconsulari, Turris Tamalleni, Turrisblanda, Turuzi, Tusuros, Uccula, Uchi maius, Ucres, Ululi, Unizibira, Uppenna, Urusi, Usula, Uthina, Utica, Utimma, Utimmira, Uzalis, Uzippari, Uzita, Vaga, Valentiniana, Vallis, Vartana, Vassinassa, Vazari, Vazari-Didda, Vazi-Sarra, Vegesela in Byzacena, Vertara, Vibiana, Victoriana, Vicus Aterii, Vicus Augusti, Vicus Turris, Villamagna in Proconsulari, Vina, Vinda, Vita, Voli, Zama maior, Zama minor, Zarna, Zella, Zica, Zuri.

Tunisian independence
The number of Catholics fell following Tunisian independence. The ownership of many Catholic buildings, including the Saint Louis Cathedral, was transferred to the state under a modus vivendi reached between the Holy See and the Republic of Tunisia.

Facilities
Catholics form the majority (around 20,000 out of 25,000) of Christians in the country. However, only about 500 of these Catholics regularly practice. The Diocese of Tunis operates 12 churches, 9 schools, several libraries, and 2 clinics.  In addition to holding religious services, the Catholic Church has opened a monastery, freely organized cultural activities, and performed charitable work throughout the country. Occasionally, Catholic religious groups hold services in private residences or other locations.

Ecumenical outreach 
Pope John Paul II visited Tunisia on April 15, 1996, to give support to the Church there and called for a peaceful dialogue between Muslims and Christians across North Africa.

See also
Religion in Tunisia
:Category:Churches in Tunisia
List of Saints from Africa
Sainte-Croix Church of Tunis, a former church building

References

External links
Homepage of the Diocese of Tunis
Profile of the Catholic Church in Tunisia 

 
Tunisia